Bletting is a process of softening that certain fleshy fruits undergo, beyond ripening. There are some fruits that are either sweeter after some bletting, such as sea buckthorn, or for which most varieties can be eaten raw only after bletting, such as medlars, persimmons, quince, service tree fruit, and wild service tree fruit (popularly known as chequers). The rowan or mountain ash fruit must be bletted and cooked to be edible, to break down the toxic parasorbic acid (hexenollactone) into sorbic acid.

History 
The English verb to blet was coined by John Lindley, in his Introduction to Botany (1835). He derived it from the French poire blette meaning 'overripe pear'. "After the period of ripeness", he wrote, "most fleshy fruits undergo a new kind of alteration; their flesh either rots or blets."

In Shakespeare's Measure for Measure, he alluded to bletting when he wrote (IV. iii. 167) "They would have married me to the rotten Medler." Thomas Dekker also draws a similar comparison in his play The Honest Whore: "I scarce know her, for the beauty of her cheek hath, like the moon, suffered strange eclipses since I beheld it: women are like medlars – no sooner ripe but rotten." Elsewhere in literature, D. H. Lawrence dubbed medlars "wineskins of brown morbidity."

There is also an old saying, used in Don Quixote, that "time and straw make the medlars ripe", referring to the bletting process.

Process 

Chemically speaking, bletting brings about an increase in sugars and a decrease in the acids and tannins that make the unripe fruit astringent.

Ripe medlars, for example, are taken from the tree, placed somewhere cool, and allowed to further ripen for several weeks. In Trees and Shrubs, horticulturist F. A. Bush wrote about medlars that "if the fruit is wanted it should be left on the tree until late October and stored until it appears in the first stages of decay; then it is ready for eating. More often the fruit is used for making jelly." Ideally, the fruit should be harvested from the tree immediately following a hard frost, which starts the bletting process by breaking down cell walls and speeding softening.

Once the process is complete, the medlar flesh will have broken down enough that it can be spooned out of the skin. The taste of the sticky, mushy substance has been compared to sweet dates and dry applesauce, with a hint of cinnamon. In Notes on a Cellar-Book, the great English oenophile George Saintsbury called bletted medlars the "ideal fruit to accompany wine."

See also 

 
 , whose tamr (ripe, sun-dried) stage is similar to bletting

References 

Fruit
Horticulture
Food science
Plant physiology